The Mouvement Militant Mauricien (MMM) is a left-wing socialist political party in Mauritius. The party was formed by a group of students in the late 1960s. The MMM advocates what it sees as a "fairer" society, without discrimination on the basis of social class, race, community, caste, religion, gender or sexual orientation.

In the general election of 2014, the MMM became the second largest party in the National Assembly of Mauritius with 12 Members of Parliament, and the second largest party at the municipal level, with 4 councillors.

Structure
The party is divided into twenty Regionales, one for each of the twenty National Assembly constituencies the main island is divided into. (A twenty-first constituency covers the island of Rodrigues; the MMM, like other mainland parties, typically does not contest elections there, although historically they had a Regionale organized there). The MMM is divided into branches, each of which has a minimum of ten members. Each branch sends two representatives to the local Regionale. Each Regionale has one representative on the party's Central Committee (CC). The CC also includes one male and one female representative of the party's Youth Wing. The CC elects a Political Bureau from among its own members. Ultimate power within the party consists of the Assembly of Delegates, consisting of members of all branches, which can make any decision with a simple majority by secret ballot.

Women's Wing
Since its inception in 1969, the MMM has emphasized women's rights, and claims to have been the first political party in the country to have done so.. A Women's Wing was officially organized in 1974, with the goal of ensuring consistent representation of women in the Central Committee and the Political Bureau. It also seeks to support female candidates for parliamentary elections. Its fourteen-member executive committee is elected at the same time as the party's Central Committee. The party's constitution allocates at least two positions on the Central Committee to women who are not Members of Parliament.

Youth Wing
The Youth Wing, officially Jeunesse Militante, formed in 1973,  is open to all Mauritian citizens aged between fifteen and thirty. A Youth Wing member can be affiliated to a branch or Regionale, or can join the Youth Wing directly. Membership is free of charge.

The Youth Wing is led by eleven executive members. They are chosen, normally for one year, by secret ballot of sixty representatives, three from each of the twenty Regionales.

History
The MMM was founded in 1968 as a students' movement (Club des Étudiants Mauriciens) by Paul Bérenger, Dev Virahsawmy, Zeel Peerun, Jooneed Jeeroburkhan, Fureed Muttur, Chafeekh Jeeroburkhan, Sushil Kushiram, Tirat Ramkissoon, Krishen Mati, Ah-Ken Wong, Kriti Goburdhun, Allen Sew Kwan Kan, Vela Vengaroo, and Amedee Darga amongst others. In September 1969 it became the Mouvement Militant Mauricien.

The early years
The MMM won its first parliamentary seat in a by-election in the Triolet/Pamplemousses constituency in September 1970, following the death of former Attorney-General Lall Jugnauth, who had held the seat. Dev Virahsawmy, the MMM candidate, defeated the candidate supported jointly by the governing Labour Party, the Parti Mauricien Social Démocrate (PMSD), and a smaller party (CAM) by over 5000 votes.

The MMM experienced its first schism in 1973, when Dev Virahsawmy left the party to found the MMMSP.

The path to power: 1976-1982

In 1976, in the first general election since independence, the MMM emerged as the largest single party, with 34 of the 70 National Assembly seats. The Labour Party, led by the incumbent Prime Minister, Sir Seewoosagur Ramgoolam, won 28 seats, and the PMSD, led by Sir Gaëtan Duval won 8. The MMM was only two seats short of a majority, but Ramgoolam remained in office by forming a coalition with the PMSD. The MMM formed a strong parliamentary opposition with Sir Anerood Jugnauth as Leader of the Opposition. Prior to the December 1976 elections Heeralall Bhugaloo defected from the MMM to join the Labour Party. For several years Heeralall Bhugaloo had been President of the MMM. Other members also followed his lead including Ramesh Fulena and Vijay Makhan.

The MMM won power in the municipalities of Port Louis, Beau Bassin/Rose Hill and Vacoas/Phoenix. The first MMM mayors were Kader Bhayat (Port Louis), Jean Claude de l'Estrac (Beau Bassin/Rose Hill) and D. Jhuboolall (Vacoas/Phoenix).

On the 13th of January 1977 Heeralall Bhugaloo resigned from his position of Minister of Education under the Labour-PMSD government which he had held since the December 1976 elections. This made way for Kher Jagatsingh who took on Bhugaloo's ministerial seat.

In the following election in 1982, the MMM campaigned on a theme of change. Using the slogan, Enn nouvo simen pou enn nouno lavie , the MMM won 42 of the directly elected seats in its own right, with a further 18 seats going to the PSM and 2 to the Rodrigues People's Organisation, both of which were electorally allied to the MMM. The MMM and its allies had thus made a unanimous sweep of the directly elected seats — an unprecedented feat. Jugnauth became Prime Minister, with Paul Bérenger as Minister of Finance.

The 1983 schism and aftermath

Disagreements within the MMM led to a schism on 22 March 1983, when Prime Minister Jugnauth rejected Bérenger's demands for the executive powers of the Prime Minister to be transferred to the Cabinet as a collective body. The party sought to replace Jugnauth with Prem Nababsing, but he dissolved Parliament before it had a chance to vote on the No Confidence motion brought by his erstwhile colleagues. Leaving the MMM, he and his remaining parliamentary supporters founded the Militant Socialist Movement (MSM). In the election that ensued, the Jugnauth's MSM and two allied parties held power, with the MMM, now led by Bérenger, winning only 19 of the 60 directly elected seats, despite gaining 46.4 percent of the popular vote. The MMM was to remain in opposition for the rest of the decade; despite winning 47.3 percent of the popular vote in the 1987 election, it secured only 21 of the 60 directly elected seats.

Since 1990

Mauritian politics since the 1990s has been characterized by frequently shifting political alliances involving the MMM, the MSM, the Labour Party, and some smaller parties. The MMM formed an alliance with the MSM for the 1990 elections, campaigning for Mauritius to cut its ties with the British monarchy and become a republic. The coalition subsequently broke down, however, and in the 1995 elections, the MMM joined forces with the Labour Party. This alliance swept all 60 directly elected seats, with 35 seats going to Labour and 25 to the MMM. The Labour Party leader, Navin Ramgoolam became Prime Minister with Bérenger as his Deputy. In 1997, however, Ramgoolam dismissed all MMM ministers, including Bérenger, and formed a one-party Cabinet.

In the 2000 elections, the MMM again formed an alliance with the MSM, under an agreement that each party would contest an equal number of parliamentary seats; if successful, they would divide the Cabinet posts equally, and that Jugnauth, the MSM leader, would serve as Prime Minister for three years, after which he would resign, assume the largely ceremonial Presidency, and hand the Prime Minister's office over to Bérenger. Accordingly, Bérenger succeeded Jugnauth as Prime Minister on 30 September 2003. He led the MMM/MSM alliance to defeat in the elections of 2005, however. The alliance subsequently broke up and the MMM contested the May 2010 elections against the MSM as part of the Alliance du Coeur with two smaller parties — the Union National of Ashock Jugnauth and Social Democrat Mauritian Mouvement (MMSD) of Eric Guimbeau. The Alliance du Coeur won only 18 of the 60 directly elected seats, as well as two indirectly elected seats.

By 2014, the deputy leader of the party resigned when the MMM had formed a new alliance with the Labour Party. In the general election held on 10 December that year, this alliance won only 16 of the 69 directly and indirectly elected seats. Of these, 12 were won by the MMM itself.  In 2015, the future of the party was questioned after several members resigned from the party.

Party leaders

Parliament

Affiliations
The MMM is a member of the Socialist International, an international grouping of socialist, social-democratic, and labour parties, as well as the Progressive Alliance.

References

External links
 

Full member parties of the Socialist International
Main
Political parties established in 1969
Political parties in Mauritius
Progressive Alliance
Social democratic parties in Africa
Socialist parties in Mauritius